Benjamin Labaree (June 3, 1801 – November 15, 1883) was a minister, professor and the longest serving president of Middlebury College from 1840 until 1866. Labaree was born in Charlestown, New Hampshire. He was an 1828 graduate of Dartmouth College as well as a recipient of graduate degrees from the University of Vermont and Dartmouth.

1801 births
1883 deaths
Dartmouth College alumni
American Christian clergy
19th-century Christian clergy
Presidents of Middlebury College
University of Vermont alumni
People from Charlestown, New Hampshire
People from Walpole, New Hampshire
19th-century American clergy